is a Japanese voice actress and singer.

She worked on the music group Bohemian Quarter's album "Blister Pack Voices". She and Emiri Kato were in a duo music group called Kato*Fuku, which sang theme songs for When Supernatural Battles Became Commonplace and Battle Spirits Saikyo Ginga Ultimate Zero. Kato*Fuku released three albums from 2012 to 2015, and disbanded in 2016.

Filmography

Anime

ONA / OVA
Lucky Star: Original na Visual to Animation (Tsukasa Hiiragi) (2008)
Yotsunoha (Nanami Minami) (2008)
Ashiaraiyashiki no Jūnin-tachi (Koma Ryusoji) (2010)
Heaven's Lost Property (Astrea) (2010)
A Channel + smile (Run Momoki) (2012)
Chūnibyō demo Koi ga Shitai! Lite (Kuzuha Togashi) (2012)
Lucky Star: Miyakawa-ke no Kūfuku (Tsukasa Hiiragi) (2012)

Anime Films
Heaven's Lost Property the Movie: The Angeloid of Clockwork (Astrea) (2011)
Wake Up, Girls! Shichi-nin no Idol (Nanoka Aizawa) (2014)
Sora no Otoshimono Final: Eternal My Master (Astrea) (2014)
Love, Chunibyo & Other Delusions! Take on Me (Kuzuha Togashi) (2018)

Drama CDs
KonoSuba (Aqua) (2015)

Video games
Gyakuten Saiban 2 (Pearl Fey/Harumi Ayasato) (2002)
Sora no Otoshimono Forte: Dreamy Season (Nintendo DS) (Astraea) (2011)
Granblue Fantasy (Sophia) (2014)
Bullet Girls (2014)
Tokyo Mirage Sessions ♯FE (Mamori Minamoto) (2015)

Dubbing

Discography

References

External links

 Kato*Fuku profile at Oricon 

Japanese voice actresses
Living people
1986 births
Musicians from Chiba Prefecture
Voice actresses from Chiba Prefecture
Japanese video game actresses
21st-century Japanese actresses
21st-century Japanese women singers
21st-century Japanese singers